Amédée Borsari (23 December 1905 – 21 June 1999) was a French composer.

Life 
Born in Paris, Borsari began piano studies with Georges Falkenberg, and harmony with Charles Silver at the Conservatoire de Paris. He then worked with Vincent d'Indy at the Schola Cantorum de Paris. Abandoning the principles of the schola in the mid-1930s, he composed in a clear and sober style that is in keeping with the French tradition of the first half of the 20th century. His work has been awarded several prizes.

Borsari died in  Eaubonne (Val-d'Oise).

Main works 
 3 string quartets
 Prélude pour la mort de Roland, (1940–41), for orchestra
 Histoires enfantines, for soprano and orchestra (1942)
 Quintet with piano
 Eudaïmon-Symphonie (1946)
 Paysage d'été (1948)
 La Grande Place (1952)
 La Cathédrale meurtrie (1955)
 Concerto for piano and orchestra "Américain" (1941)
 2nd concerto for piano (1946)
 Concerto for saxophone and string orchestra (1947)
 3rd concerto for harpsichord or piano, and 11 instruments (1950)

Sources 
 Dictionnaire de la Musique, Marc Honegger, éd. Bordas, 1986

References

External links 

1905 births
1999 deaths
Musicians from Paris
Conservatoire de Paris alumni
Schola Cantorum de Paris alumni
20th-century French composers
French classical composers
French male classical composers
20th-century French male musicians